Noah Hotham (born 23 May 2003) is a New Zealand rugby union player who plays for  in the Bunnings NPC and the  in Super Rugby. His position is halfback.

Career 
Hotham was named in the Tasman Mako squad as a development player for the 2021 Bunnings NPC. He made his debut for Tasman against  at Trafalgar Park in a non-competition match, coming off the bench in a 26–9 win for the Mako. He played his first official Bunnings NPC match in the final of the competition against  in his hometown of Hamilton, with Tasman losing 23–20.

References

External links

New Zealand rugby union players
Living people
People educated at Hamilton Boys' High School
Rugby union players from Hamilton, New Zealand
Tasman rugby union players
Rugby union scrum-halves
Crusaders (rugby union) players